Carrington is a suburb of Newcastle, New South Wales, Australia, and is named after Lord Carrington, governor of New South Wales in 1887 when the area was proclaimed a municipality.

Carrington had a population of almost 2,000 in 2016.

Origins
Carrington was known by Aboriginal people as the place of the mud crab "wuna-r tee". Early land use by Aboriginals was for fishing and gathering oysters and mud crabs. During the settlement of 1804, it was referred to as Chapman's Island and considered as a site for a gaol.

Carrington is a testament to the white settlers' need to reshape the environment. Originally, the island was underwater at high tide and was slowly built up by ships dumping ballast and other reclamation work, which eventually saw the island grow out of the mud.

Carrington emerged as a residential suburb in the 1860s when many people moved to the island to escape the dirt and noise of the city or were forced off Honeysuckle Point as a result of land reclamation for port purposes. Early access to the island was by rowboat or punt across Throsby creek or on the Onebygamba express, a two-horse coach. There was also a footbridge from Honeysuckle at one point. Carrington was rich and progressive despite its relatively small size and was one of the few areas of Crown land close to Newcastle, the rest of the land in the area was owned by large companies or private individuals. Carrington was systematically sold off as it became more valuable.

In 1887 Carrington was constituted as a Municipality and the first council meeting was held on 1 June 1888. By 1900, the population was 2200, and Carrington had developed as a working class suburb and had a fearsome reputation. In the 1920s, steelworkers moved into the area, taking advantage of the proximity to the fledgling BHP works.

The Carrington Pump House, pictured, supplied power to a series of cranes which operated along 'The Dyke' loading ships with coal and other freight. This is probably the most significant surviving building from Newcastle's nineteenth century industrial past. These cranes were of the latest technology, built by Armstrong Whitworth in Newcastle upon Tyne.

The Great Depression hit Carrington with a vengeance. In 1933 Carrington had up to 58% of wage earners either unemployed or in part-time employ. A shanty town called "Texas" sprung up during the depression and provided shelter for many homeless and unemployed. It got the name Texas due to the fact that land used to be used for stables.

Street Names
Most streets throughout the suburb are named after prominent pre-federation administrators, politicians and monarchs:

Queen of Australia 
The following streets are named after former Queens of Australia:
 Elizabeth St, Elizabeth II (renamed from William St for 1954 Royal Tour of Australia
 Victoria St, Victoria

Governor of New South Wales
The following streets are named after former Governors of New South Wales:
 Young St, Sir John Young
 Gipps St, Sir George Gipps
 Bourke St, Sir Richard Bourke
 Darling St, Sir Ralph Darling 
 Fitzroy St, Sir Charles Augustus FitzRoy
 Denison St, Sir William Denison

Chief Justice of New South Wales
The following streets are named after former Chief Justices of New South Wales:
 Forbes St, Sir Francis Forbes 
 Hargrave St, Sir John Hargrave (Supreme Court Judge only)

Premier of New South Wales
The following streets are named after former Premiers of New South Wales:
 Cowper St, Sir Charles Cowper
 Parker St, Sir Henry Parker
 Robertson St, Sir John Robertson

Politicians
 Arnold St, William Arnold 
 Darvall St, Sir John Darvall
 Garrett St, Thomas Garrett
 Smart St, Thomas Smart
 Wilson St, Bowie Wilson (previously Little Dension St)

Carrington Council
 Booth St, Edward Booth, Alderman of Carrington Council
 Coe St, H.N. Coe, Last Mayor of Carrington Council  
 Doran St, James Doran, Mayor of Carrington Council
 Howden St, John Howden, Early settler & developer
 Marsden St, George Marsden, Mayor of Carrington Council  
 Mathieson St, Alexander Mathieson, Mayor of Carrington Council (previously Little Gipps St)
 McCann St, Robert McCann, Mayor of Carrington Council    
 Rodgers St, James Stuart Rodgers, Mayor of Carrington Council (previously Little Young St)   
 Scott St, David Scott, Mayor of Carrington Council & Member of Parliament for Newcastle (previously Little Bourke St)

Today
Carrington is a mixed residential, commercial and industrial development that is physically separated from other suburbs. It is close to the harbour and central business district, services the Port and as such has expensive housing. It is accessible by Cowper Street bridge over Throsby Creek.

Population
According to the 2016 census of Population, there were 1,929 people in Carrington.
 Aboriginal and Torres Strait Islander people made up 7.2% of the population.
 85.2% of people were born in Australia and 90.4% of people only spoke English at home.
 The most common responses for religion were No Religion 43.1%, Catholic 18.4% and Anglican 16.3%.

Heritage listings
Carrington has a number of heritage-listed sites, including:
 106 Bourke Street: Carrington Pump House

Gallery

External links
 Basic map of Carrington

References

Suburbs of Newcastle, New South Wales